Bagalur  is a village in the southern state of Karnataka, India. It is located in the Bangalore Urban district of Karnataka.

Demographics
As of 2001 India census, Bagalur had a population of 7519 with 3852 males and 3667 females.

References

Neighbourhoods in Bangalore